USS Prometheus may refer to the follow ships of the United States Navy:

 , a brig in the United States Navy from 1814 to 1818
 , a repair ship that served during World War I and World War II

United States Navy ship names